Alex Otaola (Alejandro Otaola) is a rock and jazz musician from the Mexican capital, Mexico City. During his career he has been a member of numerous bands such as Santa Sabina, La Barranca San Pascualito Rey and Cuca. In 2007 he started a solo career with the audiovisual CD/DVD 'Fractales'. In 2010 he released a live (at Mexico's Cineteca Nacional) cd of music for Dziga Vertov's 'Hombre de la Cámara'. 2013 saw the release of the 'iNFiNiTO' app (a never-the-same-twice album) with Mexico's top jazz singer Iraida Noriega.

Santa Sabina
Otaola joined Santa Sabina as a replacement for their original guitarist Pablo Valero in 1995. During his time with the band he contributed to the following albums:

Concierto Acustico
Babel
MTV Unplugged
Mar Adentro En La Sangre
Espiral
En Vivo: XV Anniversario

La Barranca
In 1999, while still working with Santa Sabina, Alex Otaola joined La Barranca. He became 2nd guitarist and keyboardist behind Jose Manuel Aguilera. When La Barranca was dissolved in 2006, Otaola had been involved in writing and performing for four albums:

Rueda de Los Tiempos
Denzura
Cielo Protector
El Fluir
Yendo Al Cine Solo, a solo project by Jose Manuel Aguilera.

Involvement in other projects
Over the years Alex Otaola has performed as a guest musician on a number of rock, jazz and pop projects such as:
Petroleo
Panteon Rococo
Monocordio
Regina Orozco
El Haragan
Jorge "Ziggy" Fratta
Sr. Gonzalez
Cecilia Toussaint
LabA (Alonso Arreola)
Forseps (José Fors)
Klezmerson
El Clan
Yokozuna
Los Dorados
Zoe

Solo career
In 2007, Alex Otaola released a solo project titled Fractales published by the Mexican independent label Intolerancia. The album combines improvised music on guitar and guitar synthesizer with fully composed instrumental songs, including contributions played by former band colleagues from Santa Sabina and La Barranca.

References

 
Alejandro Otaola at Godin Player News (godinguitars.com)
[ Santa Sabina bio at AMG]
La Barranca at re-usa.com
La Barranca at Radios.nocheltina.com

External links
 Official website of Alex Otaola

Living people
Mexican guitarists
Mexican male guitarists
Musicians from Mexico City
Year of birth missing (living people)